The 1972–73 Indiana Hoosiers men's basketball team represented Indiana University. Their head coach was Bobby Knight, who was in his 2nd year. The team played its home games in Assembly Hall in Bloomington, Indiana, and was a member of the Big Ten Conference.

The Hoosiers finished the regular season with an overall record of 22–6 and a conference record of 11–3, finishing 1st in the Big Ten Conference. After a quick first-round exit during the 1972 NIT, Indiana was invited to participate in the 1973 NCAA Tournament, where Bobby Knight and the Hoosiers advanced to the Final Four. IU lost to the UCLA Bruins who went on to win their 7th straight national title; however, IU secured third place after beating Providence.

Roster

Schedule/Results

|-
!colspan=8| Regular Season
|-

|-
!colspan=8| NCAA tournament

Team players drafted into the NBA

References

Indiana Hoosiers
Indiana Hoosiers men's basketball seasons
Indiana
NCAA Division I men's basketball tournament Final Four seasons
Indiana Hoosiers men's basketball
Indiana Hoosiers men's basketball